Otakar Vejvoda (born 18 June 1972 in Kladno, Czechoslovakia) is a Czech former ice hockey forward. He was a member of the gold medal-winning Czech team at the 1996 World Championships.

References

External links
 

1972 births
Living people
Czech ice hockey forwards
Sportspeople from Kladno
20th-century Czech people
Czechoslovak ice hockey forwards
Czech expatriate ice hockey players in Sweden